James Maury Henson (September 24, 1936 – May 16, 1990) was an American puppeteer, animator, cartoonist, actor, inventor, and filmmaker who achieved worldwide notice as the creator of The Muppets and Fraggle Rock (1983–1987)  and director of The Dark Crystal (1982) and Labyrinth (1986). He was born in Greenville, Mississippi, and raised in both Leland, Mississippi, and University Park, Maryland.

Henson began developing puppets in high school. He created Sam and Friends (1955–1961), a short-form comedy television program, while he was a freshman at the University of Maryland, College Park in collaboration with Jane Nebel, who was a senior there. A few years later the two married. He graduated from the University of Maryland with a degree in home economics, after which he and Jane produced coffee advertisements and developed experimental films. In 1958, he co-founded Muppets, Inc. with Jane; it later became The Jim Henson Company.

In 1969, Henson joined the children's educational television program Sesame Street (1969–present) where he helped to develop Muppet characters for the series. He and his creative team also appeared on the first season of the sketch comedy show Saturday Night Live (1975–present). He produced The Muppet Show (1976–1981) during this period. He won fame for his characters, particularly Kermit the Frog, Rowlf the Dog and Ernie. During the later years of his life, he founded the Jim Henson Foundation and Jim Henson's Creature Shop. He won the Emmy Award twice for his involvement in The StoryTeller (1987–1988) and The Jim Henson Hour (1989).

On May 16, 1990, Henson died in New York City at age 53 from streptococcal toxic shock syndrome caused by Streptococcus pyogenes. He posthumously received a star on the Hollywood Walk of Fame in 1991, and was named a Disney Legend in 2011.

Biography

Early life: 1936–1960
Henson was born James Maury Henson on September 24, 1936, in Greenville, Mississippi, the younger of two children of Paul Ransom Henson (1904–1994), an agronomist for the United States Department of Agriculture, and his wife Betty Marcella (née Brown, 1904–1972). Henson's older brother, Paul Ransom Henson, Jr. (1932–1956), died in a car crash on April 15, 1956. He was raised as a Christian Scientist and spent his early childhood in nearby Leland, Mississippi, before moving with his family to University Park, Maryland, near Washington, D.C., in the late 1940s. He remembered the arrival of the family's first television as "the biggest event of his adolescence", being heavily influenced by radio ventriloquist Edgar Bergen and the early television puppets of Burr Tillstrom on Kukla, Fran and Ollie and Bil and Cora Baird. He remained a Christian Scientist at least into his twenties when he taught Sunday school, but he wrote to a Christian Science church in 1975 to inform them that he was no longer a practicing member.

At age 18, Henson began working for WTOP-TV (now WUSA-TV) in 1954 while attending Northwestern High School, creating puppets for a Saturday morning children's show called The Junior Morning Show. He enrolled at the University of Maryland, College Park as a studio arts major upon graduation, thinking that he might become a commercial artist. A puppetry class offered in the applied arts department introduced him to the craft and textiles courses in the college of home economics. He graduated in 1960 with a Bachelor of Science degree in home economics. As a freshman, he created Sam and Friends, a five-minute puppet show for WRC-TV in Washington, D.C. The characters on Sam and Friends were forerunners of the Muppets, and the show included a prototype of Henson's most famous character Kermit the Frog. He remained at WRC from 1954 to 1961.

In the show, Henson began experimenting with techniques that changed the way in which puppetry was used on television, including using the frame defined by the camera shot to allow the puppet performer to work from off-camera. He believed that television puppets needed to have "life and sensitivity" and began making characters from flexible, fabric-covered foam rubber, allowing them to express a wider array of emotions at a time when many puppets were made of carved wood. A marionette's arms are manipulated by strings, but Henson used rods to move his Muppets' arms, allowing greater control of expression. Additionally, he wanted the Muppet characters to "speak" more creatively than was possible for previous puppets, which had random mouth movements, so he used precise mouth movements to match the dialogue.

When Henson began work on Sam and Friends, he asked fellow University of Maryland senior Jane Nebel to assist him. The show was a financial success, but he began to have doubts about going into a career performing with puppets once he graduated. He spent several months in Europe, where he was inspired by European puppet performers who looked on their work as an art form. He began dating Jane after his return to the United States.

Television and Muppets: 1961–1969

Henson spent much of the next two decades working in commercials, talk shows, and children's projects before realizing his dream of the Muppets as "entertainment for everybody". The popularity of his work on Sam and Friends in the late 1950s led to a series of guest appearances on network talk and variety shows. He appeared as a guest on many shows, including The Steve Allen Show, The Jack Paar Program, and The Ed Sullivan Show. (Sullivan introduced him as "Jim Newsom and his Puppets" on September 11, 1966.) These television broadcasts greatly increased his exposure, leading to hundreds of commercial appearances by Henson characters throughout the '60s.

Among the most popular of Henson's commercials was a series for the local Wilkins Coffee company in Washington, D.C. Most of the Wilkins advertisements followed a similar formula. Two Muppets, in this case named Wilkins and Wontkins, would appear. Wilkins would extol the product, while Wontkins would express his hatred for it, causing Wilkins to retaliate physically; examples included Wontkins being shot with a cannon, struck in the head with a hammer or baseball bat, and having a pie thrown in his face. The Jim Henson Company has posted a short selection of them. Henson later explained, "Till then, advertising agencies believed that the hard sell was the only way to get their message over on television. We took a very different approach. We tried to sell things by making people laugh."

The first seven-second commercials for Wilkins were an immediate hit and were later remade for other local coffee companies throughout the United States, such as Community Coffee, Red Diamond Coffee, La Touraine Coffee, Nash's Coffee, and Jomar Instant coffee. The characters were so successful in selling coffee that soon other companies began seeking them to promote their products, such as bakeries like Merita Breads, service station chains such as Standard Oil of Ohio and the downstream assets of Marathon Oil, and beverage bottlers such as Faygo. Over 300 "Wilkins and Wontkins" commercials were made.

Henson sold the rights to Wilkins and Wontkins to the Wilkins Company, who allowed marketing executive John T. Brady to sell the rights to some toymakers and film studios. However, in July 1992 Brady was sued by Jim Henson Productions for unfair competition in addition to copyright and trademark infringement. The Henson company claimed that Brady was incorrectly using Henson's name and likeness in their attempts to license the characters.

In 1963, Henson and his wife moved to New York City where the newly formed Muppets, Inc. resided for some time.  Jane quit performing to raise their children, and Henson hired writer Jerry Juhl in 1961 and puppet performer Frank Oz in 1963 to replace her. Henson credited them both with developing much of the humor and character of his Muppets. He and Oz developed a close friendship and a performing partnership that lasted until Henson's death; their teamwork is particularly evident in their portrayals of Bert and Ernie, Kermit and Miss Piggy, and Kermit and Fozzie Bear. In New York City, Henson formed a partnership with Bernie Brillstein, who managed Henson's career until the puppeteer's death. In the years that followed, more performers would join Henson's team, including Jerry Nelson, Fran Brill, Richard Hunt, Dave Goelz, Steve Whitmire, and Kevin Clash.

In 1964 he and his family moved to Greenwich, CT until 1971, when they moved to Bedford, New York.

Henson's talk show appearances culminated when he devised Rowlf, a piano-playing anthropomorphic dog that became the first Muppet to make regular appearances on The Jimmy Dean Show. Henson was so grateful for this break that he offered Jimmy Dean a 40-percent interest in his production company, but Dean declined, stating that Henson deserved all the rewards for his own work, a decision of conscience that Dean never regretted. From 1963 to 1966, Henson began exploring filmmaking and produced a series of experimental films. His nine-minute experimental film Time Piece was nominated for an Academy Award for Best Live Action Short Film in 1966. He produced The Cube in 1969. Around this time, he wrote the first drafts of a live-action movie script with Jerry Juhl which became Tale of Sand. The script remained in the Henson Company archives until it was adapted in the 2012 graphic novel Jim Henson's Tale of Sand.

During this time, Henson continued to work with various companies who sought out his Muppets for advertising purposes. Among his clients were Wilson Meats, Royal Crown Cola, Claussen's Bread, La Choy, and Frito-Lay, which featured an early version of his character Cookie Monster to promote their Munchos line of potato snacks. Like the Wilkins Coffee ads of the late 1950s and early 1960s, the formula stayed fairly similar. For instance, one of the Claussen's commercials featured Kermit the Frog dangling from a window while a character named Mack asks him if he brought a loaf of the company's bread; when Kermit says he did not, Mack closes the window on Kermit's fingers and causes him to fall, suggesting he "drop down" to the grocery store to buy a loaf.

Sesame Street: 1969

In 1969, television producer Joan Ganz Cooney and her staff at the Children's Television Workshop were impressed by the quality and creativity of the Henson-led team, so they asked Henson and staff to work full-time on Sesame Street, a children's program for public television that premiered on National Educational Television on November 10, 1969. Part of the show was set aside for a series of funny, colorful puppet characters living on Sesame Street, including Grover, Cookie Monster, Bert and Ernie, Oscar the Grouch, and Big Bird (the latter two performed by Caroll Spinney, a performer discovered by Henson at a Puppeteers of America festival). Henson performed the characters of Ernie, game-show host Guy Smiley, and Kermit, who appeared as a roving television news reporter.

Henson's Muppets initially appeared separately from the realistic segments on the Street, but the show was revamped to integrate the two segments, placing much greater emphasis on Henson's work. Cooney frequently praised Henson's work, and PBS called him "the spark that ignited our fledgling broadcast service." The success of Sesame Street also allowed him to stop producing commercials, and he said that "it was a pleasure to get out of that world".

Henson was also involved in producing various shows and animation inserts during the first two seasons. He produced a series of counting films for the numbers 1 through 10 which always ended with a baker (voiced by Henson) falling down the stairs while carrying the featured number of desserts. He also worked on a variety of inserts for the numbers 2 through 12, including the films "Dollhouse"; "Number Three Ball Film"; the stop-motions "King of Eight" and "Queen of Six"; the cut-out animation "Eleven Cheer"; and the computer animation "Nobody Counts To 10." He also directed the original "C Is For Cookie" and Tales from Muppetland, a short series of TV movie specials that were comic retellings of classic fairy tales aimed at a young audience and hosted by Kermit the Frog. The series included Hey, Cinderella!, The Frog Prince, and The Muppet Musicians of Bremen.

Expansion of audience: 1970–1978
Henson, Oz, and his team were concerned that the company was becoming typecast solely as purveyors of children's entertainment, so they targeted an adult audience with a series of sketches on the first season of the late-night live television variety show Saturday Night Live. Eleven Land of Gorch sketches were aired between October 1975 and January 1976 on NBC, with four additional appearances in March, April, May, and September 1976. Henson liked Lorne Michaels' work and wanted to be a part of it, but he ultimately concluded that "what we were trying to do and what his writers could write for it never gelled". The SNL writers were not comfortable writing for the characters, and they frequently disparaged Henson's creations; Michael O'Donoghue quipped, "I won't write for felt."

Henson began developing a Broadway show and a weekly television series both featuring the Muppets. The American networks rejected the series in 1976, believing that Muppets would appeal only to a child audience. Then, Henson pitched the show to British impresario Lew Grade to finance the show. The show would be shot in the United Kingdom and syndicated worldwide. That same year, he scrapped plans for his Broadway show and moved his creative team to England, where The Muppet Show began taping. The show featured Kermit as host and a variety of other characters, notably Miss Piggy, Gonzo the Great, and Fozzie Bear, along with other characters such as Animal. Henson's teammates sometimes compared his role to that of Kermit: a shy, gentle boss with "a whim of steel" who ran things like "an explosion in a mattress factory." Caroll Spinney remembered that Henson would never say he did not like something. "He would just go 'Hmm.'... And if he liked it, he would say, 'Lovely!'" Henson recognized Kermit as an alter ego, though he thought that Kermit was bolder than he; he once said of the character: "He can say things I hold back."

Transition to the big screen: 1979–1986
The Muppets appeared in their first theatrical feature film The Muppet Movie in 1979. It was both a critical and financial success; it made $65.2 million domestically and was the 61st highest-grossing film at the time. Henson's idol Edgar Bergen died at age 75 during production of the film, and Henson dedicated it to his memory. Henson as Kermit sang "The Rainbow Connection", and it hit number 25 on the Billboard Hot 100 and was nominated for an Academy Award for Best Original Song. The Henson-directed The Great Muppet Caper (1981) followed, and Henson decided to end the Muppet Show to concentrate on making films, though the Muppet characters continued to appear in TV movies and specials.

Henson also aided others in their work. During development on The Empire Strikes Back (1980), George Lucas asked him to aid make-up artist Stuart Freeborn in the creation and articulation of Yoda. Lucas had also wanted Henson to puppeteer the character, but Henson instead suggested Frank Oz for the role; Oz performed the role and continued in the subsequent Star Wars films. Lucas lobbied unsuccessfully to have Oz nominated for an Academy Award for Best Supporting Actor.

In 1982, Henson founded the Jim Henson Foundation to promote and develop the art of puppetry in the United States. Around that time, he began creating darker and more realistic fantasy films that did not feature the Muppets and displayed "a growing, brooding interest in mortality." He co-directed The Dark Crystal (1982) with Oz, "trying to go toward a sense of realism—toward a reality of creatures that are actually alive". To provide a visual style distinct from the Muppets, the puppets in The Dark Crystal were based on conceptual artwork by Brian Froud, and it was a critical success, winning several industry awards including the Saturn Award for Best Fantasy Film and the Grand Prize Winner at the Avoriaz Fantastic Film Festival. The film was less financially successful in theaters, but later claimed an enormous following and revenue when it was introduced on VHS for home entertainment.

Also in 1982, Henson co-founded Henson International Television with Peter Orton and Sophie Turner Laing as his partners. The company was a distribution company for children's, teens' and family television.

Oz directed The Muppets Take Manhattan (1984), which grossed $25.5 million domestically and ranked as one of the top 40 films of 1984. Labyrinth (1986) was a fantasy that Henson directed by himself, but—despite some positive reviews; The New York Times called it "a fabulous film"—it was a commercial disappointment. This demoralized Henson; his son Brian Henson described it as "the closest I've seen him to turning in on himself and getting quite depressed." The film later became a cult classic.

Final years: 1987–1990

Henson continued creating children's television, such as Fraggle Rock and the animated Muppet Babies. He also continued to address darker, more mature themes with the folklore and mythology-oriented show The StoryTeller (1988), which won an Emmy for Outstanding Children's Program. The next year, he returned to television with The Jim Henson Hour, which mixed lighthearted Muppet fare with more risqué material. It was critically well-received and won him another Emmy for Outstanding Directing in a Variety or Music Program, but it was canceled after 12 episodes due to poor ratings. Henson blamed its failure on NBC's constant rescheduling.

In late 1989, Henson entered into negotiations to sell his company to The Walt Disney Company for almost $150 million, hoping that he would "be able to spend a lot more of my time on the creative side of things" with Disney handling business matters. By 1990, he had completed production on the television special The Muppets at Walt Disney World and the Disney-MGM Studios attraction Muppet*Vision 3D and he was developing film ideas and a television series entitled Muppet High.

Personal life
Henson married Jane Nebel in 1959 and their children are Lisa (b. 1960), Cheryl (b. 1961), Brian (b. 1963), John (1965–2014), and Heather (b. 1970). Henson and his wife separated in 1986, although they remained close for the rest of his life. Jane said that Jim was so involved with his work that he had very little time to spend with her or their children. All five of his children began working with Muppets at an early age, partly because "one of the best ways of being around him was to work with him", according to Cheryl. Henson was a strong supporter of the civil rights movement.

Illness and death
Henson appeared with Kermit on The Arsenio Hall Show on May 4, 1990. This would be his final television appearance. He disclosed to his publicist that he was tired and had a sore throat, but that he believed it would soon go away. On May 12, 1990, Henson traveled to Ahoskie, North Carolina, with his daughter Cheryl to visit his father and stepmother. They returned to their home in New York City the following day, and Henson cancelled a Muppet recording session that had been scheduled for May 14, 1990. His wife came to visit that night.

Henson was having trouble breathing when he woke up on May 15, 1990, at around 2:00 a.m. EST, and began coughing up blood. He suggested to his wife that he might be dying, but he did not want to take time off from his schedule to visit a hospital. Two hours later, Henson agreed to be taken by taxi to the emergency room at New York–Presbyterian Hospital in Manhattan. Shortly after admission, he stopped breathing and was rushed into the intensive care unit. X-ray images of his chest revealed multiple abscesses in both of his lungs as a result of a previous bacterial infection. Henson was placed on a ventilator but quickly deteriorated over the next several hours despite increasingly aggressive treatment with multiple antibiotics. Although the medicine killed off most of the infection, it had already weakened many of Henson's organs, and he died at 1:21 a.m. the following morning. He was 53.

Dr. David Gelmont announced that Henson had died from Streptococcus pneumoniae, an infection that causes bacterial pneumonia. However, on May 29, 1990, Gelmont reclassified it as organ dysfunction resulting from streptococcal toxic shock syndrome caused by Streptococcus pyogenes. Gelmont noted Henson might have been saved had he gone to hospital even just a few hours sooner. Medical expert Lawrence D. Altman also stated that Henson's death "may have shocked many Americans who believed that bacterial infections no longer could kill with such swiftness." Henson's closest collaborator, Frank Oz, believes that the stress of negotiating with Disney led to Henson's death, stating in a 2021 interview that "The Disney deal is probably what killed Jim. It made him sick."

Memorials 
News of Henson's death spread quickly and admirers of his work responded from around the world with tributes and condolences. Many of Henson's co-stars and directors from Sesame Street, the Muppets, and other works also shared their thoughts on his death. On May 21, 1990, Henson's public memorial service was conducted in Manhattan at the Cathedral of St. John the Divine. Another was conducted on July 2, 1990, at St Paul's Cathedral in London. In accordance with Henson's wishes, no one in attendance wore black, and the Dirty Dozen Brass Band finished the service by performing "When the Saints Go Marching In". Harry Belafonte sang "Turn the World Around", a song that he had debuted on The Muppet Show, as each member of the congregation waved a brightly colored foam butterfly attached to a puppet performer's rod. Later, Big Bird (performed by Caroll Spinney) walked onto the stage and sang Kermit's signature song "Bein' Green" while fighting back tears. Dave Goelz, Frank Oz, Kevin Clash, Steve Whitmire, Jerry Nelson, and Richard Hunt sang a medley of Henson's favorite songs in their characters' voices, ending with a performance of "Just One Person" while performing their Muppets. The funeral was described by Life as "an epic and almost unbearably moving event". Henson was cremated and in 1992, his ashes were scattered near Taos in New Mexico.

Legacy
The Jim Henson Company and the Jim Henson Foundation continued after his death, producing new series and specials. Jim Henson's Creature Shop also continues to create characters and special effects for both Henson-related and outside projects. Steve Whitmire, who had joined the Muppets cast in 1978, began performing Kermit the Frog six months after Henson's death. He was dismissed from the cast in October 2016, and Matt Vogel succeeded him in the role of Kermit.

Sesame Workshop acquired the Sesame Street characters in 2000. On February 17, 2004, the Muppets and the Bear in the Big Blue House properties were sold to the Walt Disney Company.

One of Henson's last projects was the attraction Muppet*Vision 3D, which opened at Disney's Hollywood Studios on May 16, 1991, exactly one year after his death. The Jim Henson Company retains the Creature Shop as well as the rest of its film and television library, including Fraggle Rock, Farscape, The Dark Crystal, and Labyrinth. Brian Jay Jones wrote the book Jim Henson: The Biography. It was released on what would have been Henson's 77th birthday, September 24, 2013.

The moving-image collection of Jim Henson, which contains the film work of Jim Henson and The Jim Henson Company, is held at the Academy Film Archive.

Henson's characters are currently performed by the following puppeteers: Matt Vogel (Kermit), Peter Linz (Ernie, Link Hogthrob), Eric Jacobson (Guy Smiley, The Newsman), Dave Goelz (Waldorf) and Bill Barretta (Rowlf the Dog, The Swedish Chef, Dr. Teeth).

In 2019, the YouTube channel Defunctland released a six-part miniseries on the life and legacy of Jim Henson.

A biopic film based on Henson's life, known as Muppet Man, has been in development at Walt Disney Pictures and The Jim Henson Company since 2010. In April 2021, it was reported that Michael Mitnick was hired to rewrite the screenplay, previously written by Aaron and Jordan Kandell. Lisa Henson will serve as producer.

In March 2022, it was announced that Ron Howard planned to direct a documentary on Henson's life, with Brian Grazer's Imagine Entertainment collaborating with Disney Original Documentary to produce it. The project was reported to have "the full participation and cooperation of the Henson family".

Tributes

 In 1971, the University of Maryland's National Residence Hall Honorary chapter was founded as the Jim Henson Chapter. The UMD NRHH Chapter is still the Jim Henson Chapter to this day. The Michelle Smith Performing Arts Library created an exhibit from 2019 to 2020 highlighting Jim Henson's time at the university.
Henson is honored both as himself and as Kermit the Frog on the Hollywood Walk of Fame. Only three other people have received this honor: Walt Disney as both himself and Mickey Mouse; Mel Blanc as both himself and Bugs Bunny; and Mike Myers as both himself and Shrek. Henson was posthumously inducted into the Walk of Fame in 1991.
Henson received an Honorary Doctorate of Letters from Fordham University, Rose Hill Campus, Bronx, New York (June 1982)
Henson was inducted into the Television Hall of Fame in 1987.
 Henson received the Golden Plate Award of the American Academy of Achievement in 1987.
 The theater and Visual and Performing Arts Academy at his alma mater, Northwestern High School, in Hyattsville, MD, is named in his honor.
 Henson featured in The American Adventure in Epcot at the Walt Disney World Resort.
 The Jim Henson Exhibit, located in Leland, Mississippi, features an assortment of original Muppet characters, official certificates from the Mississippi Legislature honoring Henson and his characters, and a statue of Kermit in the middle of the stream behind the museum.
 The 1990 television special The Muppets Celebrate Jim Henson allowed the Muppets themselves to pay tribute to Henson. The special featured interviews with Steven Spielberg and others.
 Tom Smith's Henson tribute song, "A Boy and His Frog", won the Pegasus Award for Best Filk Song in 1991.
 The classes of 1994, 1998, and 1999 at the University of Maryland, College Park, Henson's alma mater, commissioned a life-size statue of Henson and Kermit the Frog, which was dedicated on September 24, 2003, which would have been Henson's 67th birthday. The statue cost $217,000 and is displayed outside Maryland's student union. In 2006, the University of Maryland introduced 50 statues of its school mascot, Testudo the Terrapin, with various designs chosen by different sponsoring groups. Among them was Kertle, a statue designed to look like Kermit the Frog by Washington, DC-based artist Elizabeth Baldwin.
 In 2003, Jim Henson was honored at the annual Norsk Høstfest in Minot, North Dakota.
 Our Atlan, Thibaut Berland, and Damien Ferrie wrote, directed, and animated a 3D tribute to Henson entitled Over Time that was shown as part of the 2005 Electronic Theater at SIGGRAPH.
 On September 28, 2005, the U.S. Postal Service issued a sheet of commemorative stamps honoring Henson and the Muppets.
 On August 9, 2011, Jim Henson posthumously received the Disney Legends Award. Two of his characters, Kermit the Frog and Rowlf the Dog, performed "The Rainbow Connection" in his honor.
 On September 24, 2011, which what would have been Henson's 75th birthday, Mississippi town Leland renamed a local bridge to "The Rainbow Connection" to honor Henson and his work. He was also honored with a Google doodle to commemorate his 75th birthday; the Google logo had six Muppets that were clickable using the "hand" buttons.
 The Center for Puppetry Arts in Atlanta opened a gallery of Muppets exhibits within the Worlds of Puppetry exhibition at the Center in November 2015, a greatly scaled-down version of what was announced in 2007 to have been a wing honoring Henson.
 In July 2016, Hyattsville, Maryland installed a memorial to Jim Henson in the city's Magruder Park, featuring a large planter embossed with images of characters from Sam & Friends and benches inscribed with quotes from Henson.
 The Jim Henson Exhibition: Imagination Unlimited, an exhibition organised by the Museum of the Moving Image showcasing over 300 artifacts from Henson's career, premiered at the Museum of Pop Culture in Seattle before opening at its permanent home in New York City in 2017. A travelling version of the exhibition, featuring over 100 objects and 25 historic puppets, has been hosted by several cultural institutions across the U.S. including Skirball Cultural Center in Los Angeles (June–September 2018), Albuquerque Museum (November 2019–April 2020), Durham Museum in Omaha (October 2020–January 2021), The Henry Ford museum in Dearborn (June–September 2021), the Contemporary Jewish Museum in San Francisco (May–August 2022), and the Grand Rapids Art Museum in Michigan (October 2022–January 2023). The travelling exhibition's final stop will be the Maryland Center for History and Culture in Baltimore (May–December 2023).
 In 2018, the American Banjo Museum inducted Henson into its hall of fame, for his positive portrayal of the banjo in his shows and in The Muppet Movie.
In 2020, the 1979 song "Rainbow Connection" from The Muppet Movie (performed by Henson as Kermit) was deemed "culturally, historically, or aesthetically significant" by the Library of Congress and selected for preservation in the National Recording Registry.
 On September 7, 2021, a blue plaque was unveiled at Jim Henson's former Hampstead home, 50 Downshire Hill NW3 to honour his artistic creativity. Henson purchased his London home in 1979 after ITV commissioned the Muppet series, filmed at Elstree Studios.
 An area outside Studio 6B at NBC's Rockefeller Center headquarters in New York City includes a set of pipes that Henson and his team of puppeteers had painted while waiting to perform on The Jack Paar Show in 1964. While the artwork has been preserved over time – Henson showed it to Gene Shalit on Today in 1980 and Paar took David Letterman over to see it during an appearance on Late Night which taped across the hall – it wasn't until Jimmy Fallon, host of the studio's current tenant The Tonight Show, brought it up that NBC officially made the pipes part of its studio tour. Frank Oz attended the ribbon-cutting for the exhibit in 2010.

Filmography

Film

Television

Video games

References

Further reading

External links

 The Jim Henson Legacy
 
 
 
 Art Directors Club biography and portrait
 Jim Henson Biography – Book Summary and Quotes
 The Jim Henson Works at the University of Maryland: 70+ digital videos available to students, scholars and visitors at the University of Maryland (College Park, MD)
 Early Jim Henson films in the AT&T Archives: "Robot" and "Charlie Magnetico", two films that Henson created for the Bell Data Communications Seminar in the early 1960s
 Jim Henson Documentary produced by the PBS Series In Their Own Words
 Documentary about Jim Henson on YouTube, produced by Defunctland
 Sam and Friends
 Sesame Street
 The Muppet Show
 Fraggle Rock
 Muppet Babies
 The Jim Henson Hour

 
1936 births
1990 deaths
20th-century American comedians
20th-century American male actors
American film producers
American male comedians
American male voice actors
American puppeteers
American sketch comedians
Artists from New York City
Comedians from Maryland
Comedians from Mississippi
Comedians from New York City
Deaths from pneumonia in New York City
Emmy Award winners
Film directors from Maryland
Film directors from Mississippi
Former Christian Scientists
Fraggle Rock performers
Grammy Award winners
Henson family (show business)
Inkpot Award winners
International Emmy Founders Award winners
Mississippi Democrats
Muppet designers
Muppet performers
Musicians from Greenville, Mississippi
Peabody Award winners
People from Leland, Mississippi
Sesame Street crew
Sesame Street Muppeteers
Television producers from New York City
The Jim Henson Company people
University of Maryland, College Park alumni
HIT Entertainment